Edgar Contreras (born 16 July 1992) is a Venezuelan taekwondo athlete.

He competed at the 2016 Summer Olympics in Rio de Janeiro, in the men's 68 kg.

In 2017, he competed in the men's featherweight event at the 2017 World Taekwondo Championships held in Muju, South Korea.

References

1992 births
Living people
Venezuelan male taekwondo practitioners
Olympic taekwondo practitioners of Venezuela
Taekwondo practitioners at the 2016 Summer Olympics
Taekwondo practitioners at the 2015 Pan American Games
Pan American Games competitors for Venezuela
21st-century Venezuelan people